Timmermann is a German surname. Notable people with the surname include:

 Hans Timmermann (1926–2005), German television actor
 Jens Timmermann (born 1970), German philosopher
 Tom Timmermann (born 1940), American baseball player

See also
 Zimmermann

German-language surnames